The  is a private museum in the city of Atami, Japan.

History 
The museum was established in 1982 by the Mokichi Okada Association (MOA) to house the art collection of their founder, multimillionaire and religious leader Mokichi Okada (1882–1955).

Collection 
The collection of the museum consists of approximately 3,500 works of art that include three National Treasures (Red and White Plum Blossoms screen by Ogata Kōrin, Nonomura Ninsei’s Tea-leaf Jar with design or wisteria, and a Calligraphy Album “Tekagami Kanboku-jo” which is an album of ancient calligraphy from the Nara to Muromachi periods), as well as 66 Important Cultural Properties of Japan.

The collection covers a wide span of classical Japanese paintings, hanging scrolls, Japanese sculpture, porcelain and lacquerwork from China and Japan.

The museum also has a reconstruction of the 16th century Golden Tea Room, which was made under the supervision of the architect Sutemi Horiguchi, an expert of sukiya architecture.

See also
List of National Treasures of Japan (paintings)
List of National Treasures of Japan (writings)
List of National Treasures of Japan (crafts-others)

References

External links
 moaart.or.jp Home page
MOA Museum of Art within Google Arts & Culture

1982 establishments in Japan
Art museums and galleries in Japan
Art museums established in 1982
Museums in Shizuoka Prefecture
Atami, Shizuoka